The Roraiman antbird (Myrmelastes saturatus) is a species of passerine bird in the family Thamnophilidae.

Until recently, it was considered a subspecies of the spot-winged antbird, but based on differences in voice and plumage it has been recommended that they are treated as separate species. As presently defined, the Roraiman antbird includes the subspecies obscura.

It is found in humid forest associated with the Tepuis of south-eastern Venezuela, Guyana and far northern Brazil (northern Roraima only). Although generally uncommon, it is considered to be of least concern by BirdLife International.

References

 Roraiman Antbird. BirdLife Species Factsheet. Accessed 2008-06-27

Roraiman antbird
Birds of the Guianas
Roraiman antbird
Roraiman antbird
Birds of the Tepuis